Il Marzocco was an Italian language weekly literary and art magazine which was published in Florence, Italy, between 1896 and 1932. The title was chosen by Gabriele D'Annunzio which was a reference to the symbol of the ancient Republic of Florence and also, of the popular rule. The magazine covered articles on a wide range of subjects such as women's rights and political events. Its subtitle was periodico settimanale di letteratura e d'arte (Italian: Weekly literary and arts periodical).

History and profile
Il Marzocco was launched in 1896, and the first issue appeared on 2 February 1996. The founders were brothers Angelo and Adolfo Orvieto, and the headquarters of Il Marzocco was in Florence. The magazine advocated the aestheticist approach of Gabriele D'Annunzio and an antipositivist stance until 1899. Then it supported pure literature and art opposing the decorative literature. In the period 1911–1914 Il Marzocco rarely featured literary work and became a political publication supporting the nationalism and war interventionism. Following the end of World War I and the start of fascist rule in Italy the magazine managed to remain untouched and was not affected from the negative effects of the press laws dated 1926.

As of 1926 Adolfo Orvieto was the editor-in-chief of Il Marzocco which was published on a weekly basis. Ada Negri, Sibilla Aleramo and Enrico Corradini were among the contributors. The former published an article in Il Marzocco to support the right of single women to give birth children. Corradini served as the director of the magazine and also, published political comments when he was not a well-known figure in politics. Il Marzocco praised Émile Zola as a genuine hero of modernism. The magazine folded in 1932.

The issues of Il Marzocco were digitized by the National Library of Italy in Rome.

References

External links

1896 establishments in Italy
1932 disestablishments in Italy
Defunct literary magazines published in Italy
Defunct political magazines published in Italy
Italian-language magazines
Italian nationalism
Magazines established in 1896
Magazines disestablished in 1932
Magazines published in Florence
Weekly magazines published in Italy